Tess Mattisson (born 13 February 1978) is a Swedish singer and main character of eurodance group La Cream. Her mother is of Swedish/Belgian origin and her father of Finnish/Indian origin. She worked as a dancer and back-up singer for Rob'n'Raz, Dr. Alban, Basic Element and Drömhus. She has also studied French for three years.

Discography

Album 
Sound & Vision (as La Cream, 1999)
One Love to Justify (2001)

Singles

Video games
Tess has a total of 2 songs which appear in the Dance Dance Revolution arcade series. StepManiaX also features these songs, plus "Confusion".

References

1978 births
Living people
21st-century Swedish singers
21st-century Swedish women singers